Veljko Bakašun (June 14, 1920 – July 17, 2007) was a Croat water polo player who competed for Yugoslavia in the 1948 Summer Olympics and in the 1952 Summer Olympics.

He died in Korčula.

Bakašun was part of the Yugoslav team which was eliminated in the second round of the 1948 Olympic tournament. He played all three matches.

Four years later he won the silver medal with the Yugoslav team in the 1952 tournament. He played six matches.

See also
 List of Olympic medalists in water polo (men)

External links
 

1920 births
2007 deaths
Croatian male water polo players
Yugoslav male water polo players
Olympic water polo players of Yugoslavia
Water polo players at the 1948 Summer Olympics
Water polo players at the 1952 Summer Olympics
Olympic silver medalists for Yugoslavia
Olympic medalists in water polo
Medalists at the 1952 Summer Olympics